This is a list of lighthouses in the province of Manitoba, Canada.

Lighthouses

See also

List of lighthouses in Canada

References

External links

 List of Lights, Buoys and Fog Signals Canadian Coast Guard. Retrieved 19 March 2017

 
Manitoba
Lighthouses